Márcio Zanardi Gomes da Silva (born 11 July 1978) is a Brazilian professional football coach who is currently in charge of São Bernardo.

Career
Born in São Paulo, Zanardi began his career with Pão de Açúcar EC's under-15 sides before moving to Lithuania in 2006, with FC Vilnius. He then worked for three years in the United Arab Emirates with Al-Nasr, before returning to Brazil in 2010 with Corinthians.

After working in the under-13, under-15 and under-17 sides of Corinthians, Zanardi was dismissed by the club on 21 November 2016. The following 3 May, he was appointed head coach of Portuguesa's under-20 squad.

In August 2017, Zanardi was promoted to Lusas main squad as an assistant. The following 20 February, he moved to Guarani and took over the under-20s.

On 19 February 2019, Zanardi was named head coach of the under-20 side of Santos. He left roughly a year later, and took over the same category at São Bernardo shortly after.

On 1 October 2021, after first team trainer Ricardo Catalá left, Zanardi was appointed in charge of São Bernardo for the remainder of the Copa Paulista, and led the side to their second-ever title of the tournament.

Personal life
Zanardi's older brother Caio is also a football coach.

Honours
São Bernardo
Copa Paulista: 2021

References

External links

1978 births
Living people
Sportspeople from São Paulo
Brazilian football managers
São Bernardo Futebol Clube managers
Santos FC non-playing staff
Brazilian expatriate football managers
Brazilian expatriate sportspeople in Lithuania
Brazilian expatriate sportspeople in the United Arab Emirates
Expatriate football managers in Lithuania
Expatriate football managers in the United Arab Emirates